Events from the year 1842 in the United Kingdom.

Incumbents
 Monarch – Victoria
 Prime Minister – Robert Peel (Conservative)
 Foreign Secretary – George Hamilton-Gordon, 4th Earl of Aberdeen 
 Parliament – 14th

Events
 6–13 January – First Anglo-Afghan War – Massacre of Elphinstone's army (Battle of Gandamak) by Afghan forces on the road from Kabul to Jalalabad, Afghanistan, under Akbar Khan, son of Dost Mohammed Khan.
 February – J. H. Newman, the controversial Anglican cleric, withdraws to Littlemore, outside Oxford, and establishes a semi-monastic community, "the house of the Blessed Virgin Mary at Littlemore".
 31 March – Middleton Junction and Oldham Branch Railway line opened up to Werneth.
 13 April – first Anglo-Afghan War: British victory at the Battle of Jellalabad.
 April–September – General Strike ("Plug Plot Riots").
 25 April – Black Country Nailers' Riots.
 11 May – Income Tax Act 1842 establishes the first peacetime income tax in Britain; 7 pence on the pound, for incomes over 150 pounds.
 4 June – in South Africa, hunter Dick King rides into the British military base in Grahamstown to warn that Boers have besieged Durban. He had set out eleven days earlier. The British Army dispatches a relief force.
 13 June
 Queen Victoria makes the first train journey by a reigning British monarch, on the Great Western Railway (Slough to Paddington).
 The half farthing coin is made legal tender in the U.K.
 19 June – army suppresses Rebecca Rioters in Carmarthen protesting against turnpike tolls.
 16 July – Treason Act 1842 amends procedures and penalties against those threatening the monarch's life.
 1 August – Mines and Collieries Act 1842 makes it illegal for women and girls of any age, and boys under ten years, to work underground, following the 1838 Huskar Pit disaster which resulted in the deaths by drowning of 26 children aged 7 to 17.
 August–October – first Anglo-Afghan War: British victory at the Battle of Kabul.
 7–27 August – riots in and around Lancashire (spreading to Yorkshire by around 12 August), protesting against the Corn Laws and in favour of Chartists.
 9 August – the United Kingdom and United States sign the Webster-Ashburton Treaty agreeing the border between the United States and Canada.
 29 August – Britain and Qing dynasty China sign the Treaty of Nanking, an unequal treaty ending the First Opium War. Hong Kong is ceded to Britain.
 10 & 19 November – London debtor's prisons the Fleet Prison and Marshalsea are closed and inmates transferred to Queen's Bench Prison. Pentonville Prison for criminals is completed in north London this year.

Undated
 Beecham's Pills (a laxative) first marketed in St Helens, Lancashire by Thomas Beecham, forming the basis of the Beecham Group and GSK plc pharmaceutical companies.
 John Kilner & Co., glass manufacturers, established in Castleford, Yorkshire, to produce the Kilner jar.
 New pattern musket with percussion cap produced to replace the flintlock in the British Army.
 Paleontologist Richard Owen coins the term "Dinosaur".
 Antarctic explorer James Clark Ross charts the eastern side of James Ross Island.
 J. M. W. Turner paints Peace – Burial at Sea and Snowstorm - steam boat off a harbour's mouth.

Publications
 14 May – The Illustrated London News first published.
 Edwin Chadwick's critical Report on an inquiry into the Sanitary Condition of the Labouring Population of Great Britain published by the Poor Law Commission.
 Thomas Babington Macaulay's poems Lays of Ancient Rome.
 Alfred Tennyson's collection Poems.

Births

 13 May – Arthur Sullivan, composer (died 1900)
 26 July – Alfred Marshall, economist (died 1924)
 23 August – Osborne Reynolds, engineer and physicist (died 1912)
 20 September – James Dewar, chemist and physicist (died 1923)
 12 November – John Strutt, 3rd Baron Rayleigh, physicist, Nobel Prize laureate (died 1919)
 2 December – Charles W. Alcock, footballer and football official (died 1907)

Deaths

 13 March – Henry Shrapnel, soldier and inventor (born 1761)
 5 June – Thomas Henry Lister, novelist (born 1800)
 12 June – Thomas Arnold, historian and schoolmaster (born 1795)
 1 September – Lord Robert Somerset, general (born 1776)
 7 October – Jonathan Backhouse, banker and Quaker minister (born 1779)
 31 October – Solomon Hirschell, chief rabbi of the United Kingdom (born 1762)

See also
 1842 in Scotland

References

 
Years of the 19th century in the United Kingdom